Chariots of Fur is a seven-minute Looney Tunes short released in 1994 by Warner Bros. It features Wile E. Coyote and the Road Runner and was directed by Chuck Jones, who introduced the pair in 1949. As in other shorts of the Road Runner series, Wile E. tries to catch his potential prey through the use of various devices. This film's soundtrack uses music from the Bedřich Smetana opera The Bartered Bride. It was released in North American theaters preceding the film, Richie Rich. It was the first time a new short of Wile E. Coyote and Road Runner had been released theatrically since 1966. This was the final Coyote/Road Runner short to be directed by Jones before his death on February 22, 2002. The title is a parody of Chariots of Fire.

Plot 
Introduction: At the beginning, we see the Road Runner (Boulevardius Burnupius) giving Wile E. a "come on" to chase him, and the camera moves to Wile and freezes to show his Latin name, (Dogius Ignoramii). The chase continues until the coyote stops to read a sign in the road: "WARNING: The Surgeon General has determined that chasing Road Runners may be hazardous to your health." He dismisses this sign as cheesy and laughs at it, before the Road Runner pulls up behind him and beeps the coyote into an overhanging outcropping, and consequently into another headache. With his head smashed through the outcropping, Wile recovers and sees another sign posted at the very end of the outcropping: "It's not cool to laugh at the Surgeon General."

1. Not deterred by this one bit, the coyote continues his dastardly plans: he leaves the Road Runner a free snack on the edge of a cliff while he sneaks up behind his prey and tries to eat him. However, sensing the danger, the Road Runner extends his neck all the way around the screen and beeps in the back of the coyote. To explain this, he displays a sign that says "Road Runners are extremely flexible" and leaves the scene, while Wile E. falls back onto the cliff and is left looking like an accordion.

2. In a similar scheme to one used in the previous cartoon, Wile now locks and loads an ACME Giant Mouse Trap and leaves it in the road for the Road Runner to trip. When the trap snaps, the coyote jumps out to capture his opponent, but surprise, surprise - he finds a giant mouse who is rather displeased with getting his tail caught and returns the favor to Wile's tail.

3. Still trying to make this gadget work, despite his failures with it, the coyote loads himself into a spring attached to a rock and lets go as the Road Runner passes. Voices of Spring plays on the music track as Wile E. ends up being carried across the plateau. Wile E. eventually moves into thin air, and soon catches on to the situation, gulps, and falls. As the spring unfurls through the air like a Slinky, the Road Runner ducks as the rock just misses him and dives all the way through the spring, ultimately landing on Wile, displaying a "HAVE MERCY" sign, just as he recovers from his massive fall. The coyote leaves this with a flattened head, his neck also coiled up like a Slinky.

4. With these newer cartoons come more ludicrous products, such as ACME Instant Road, which Wile E. rolls out across an arch and down the straight slope in an effort to get the Road Runner to follow him, until he runs out of road and he is left staring at the ground. He can only display a sign that says "In heaven's name - what am I doing?" (seen in the previous cartoon as well, but in distinctly older style) before he is overtaken by gravity and displays a "BYE!" sign.

5. Returning to conventional chasing and gags, the coyote tries to launch himself with a bow to chase the Road Runner, but the bow simply freezes without firing. He hangs in midair for a couple seconds before he realizes this, and attempts to fix it by playing dulcimer to the melody "Those Endearing Little Charms" on the bowstring, until it activates and Wile spears a cactus. However, this gives the coyote a new idea, displayed by a lightbulb changing from "IDEA" to "CACTUS" repeatedly.

6. The ACME Trick-or-Treat Cactus Costume has arrived, and Wile puts it on, suffering rather discomfiting pain in the process. Finally, he gets it on and hops out into the road while the Road Runner is passing him. However, he fails to grab the Road Runner and wraps his arms around himself, causing massive pain due to the spines. After Wile escapes from the costume offscreen, he kicks its box into the desert out of frustration.

7. As the Road Runner pulls up to another outcropping and signals to the coyote, Wile attempts to see-saw his way over to his rival with a rock and board. However, when the rock lands on the other side, it causes the board to smash into the coyote, and the rock then lands on the thin edge of the board, resulting in it wedging the edge of the outcropping away. This falls to the earth, with Wile, the board, the rock, and two smaller rocks located next to the see-saw following it. As the board looms over the coyote, Wile heaves it into the air before a rock hits the ground, then the outcropping edge, followed by the coyote on the right and the other rock on the left. This causes the coyote to be thrown upwards and bump his head directly on the falling board before he drops on the right side of the outcropping edge and jumps the second rock onto himself, as the board wedges just to the right.

8. Another rather ludicrous ACME product: ACME Lightning Bolts (with rubber gloves) - takes up the remainder of the cartoon. With the safety gloves, the coyote grabs a lightning bolt and successfully sizzles an appropriately labeled "Practice Cactus". He throws a second one at the Road Runner, who stops and takes stock of the situation, and turns the other way as the electricity chases him. The bolt and bird chase all over the mountains until the lightning overtakes the Road Runner, who beeps at the lightning to get it to reverse. The chase returns the way it came until the Road Runner escapes to safety up a mountain slope, while the lightning continues on its normal course - back to its thrower! Wile E.'s eyes pop out and clash with each other in reaction before following the rest of him on the run from the lightning. The hapless coyote is repeatedly prodded with white-hot lightning across the landscape and towards the setting sun.

Trivia 
 This was the final Wile E. Coyote and the Road Runner animated theatrical short directed by Chuck Jones and in three-strip Technicolor.
 Final animated theatrical three-strip Technicolor appearances of Wile E. Coyote and the Road Runner.

Home media 
The short was released by Warner Home Video on various formats. The first being a VHS entitled Road Runner & Wile E Coyote: Looney Tunes, Chariots of Fur with other various cartoons. Later on, the cartoon was included, in widescreen and full frame versions, in the Road Runner and Wile E. Coyote: Supergenius Hijinks DVD. The short is streaming on HBO Max.

References 
 
 

1994 short films
Looney Tunes shorts
American comedy short films
1994 animated films
Short films directed by Chuck Jones
Wile E. Coyote and the Road Runner films
1990s animated short films
1990s American animated films
Animated films about mammals
Animated films about birds
Warner Bros. Animation animated short films
1990s Warner Bros. animated short films
Animated films without speech
American animated short films
Films about Canis
Animated films based on classical mythology